Roridomyces roridus, commonly known as the dripping bonnet or the slippery mycena, is a species of agaric fungus in the family Mycenaceae. It is whitish or dirty yellow in color, with a broad convex cap  in diameter. The stipe is covered with a thick, slippery slime layer. This species can be bioluminescent, and is one of the several causative species of foxfire.

See also
List of bioluminescent fungi

References

Bioluminescent fungi
Mycenaceae
Fungi described in 1815
Fungi of Europe
Fungi of North America
Taxa named by Elias Magnus Fries